Bennie Johnson "Catfish" George (June 28, 1919 – August 4, 1986) was an American football, basketball, and baseball coach.  He served as the head football coach at Delaware State University from 1956 to 1958, compiling a record of 16–8–1. As the first basketball head coach in Delaware State history, George led the Hornets for 14 seasons, from 1956 to 1971, and amassing a record of 155–152. He is still the longest tenured coach in program history and was passed in 2010 by Greg Jackson for most wins.  A native of Atlanta, Georgia, George attended Morehouse College and Delaware State.  He worked as an assistant football coach at Delaware State in 1955 under his predecessor as head coach, Edward Jackson.

George graduated from Booker T. Washington High School in Atlanta and then served in the United States Army during World War II. He came to Delaware state in 1943 as a student and played football, basketball, and baseball before graduating in 1947. George joined Delaware State's faculty in 1949 as physical education instructor. He was later promoted to associate professor and then to head of the health and education department, serving in the later post until his retirement in 1979. George died of pneumonia, on August 4, 1986, at Kent General Hospital in Dover, Delaware.

Head coaching record

Football

References

External links
 

1919 births
1986 deaths
Delaware State Hornets baseball coaches
Delaware State Hornets baseball players
Delaware State Hornets football coaches
Delaware State Hornets football players
Delaware State Hornets men's basketball coaches
Delaware State Hornets men's basketball players
Delaware State University faculty
United States Army personnel of World War II
Coaches of American football from Georgia (U.S. state)
Baseball coaches from Georgia (U.S. state)
Baseball players from Atlanta
Basketball coaches from Georgia (U.S. state)
Basketball players from Atlanta
Players of American football from Atlanta
African-American coaches of American football
African-American players of American football
African-American baseball coaches
African-American baseball players
African-American basketball coaches
African-American basketball players
20th-century African-American sportspeople
Deaths from pneumonia in Delaware